Trichocentrum splendidum is a species of orchid endemic to Guatemala.

References

External links 

splendidum
Orchids of Guatemala
Endemic flora of Guatemala